A bag charm is a piece of jewellery that decorates a handbag. Bag charms may resemble a key chain, a bracelet or a necklace.

History
While charms and charm bracelets have existed since antiquity, jewellery specifically designed to adorn hand-bags (as opposed to jewellery designed to be worn on one's own body) is a relatively recent innovation, with popularity rising in the late 20th century stemming from celebrity endorsements.

Materials and price 
Bag charms have been made from practically every available material: gold, steel, textile, leather, sequins, precious and semi-precious stones, pearls, etc. Making of bag charms is not only a trade, it has become an art, with some labeled pieces, becoming priceless collectable items.

References

Jewellery
Types of jewellery
Jewellery components